Surviving Desire is a 1991 American comedy-drama film written and directed by Hal Hartley and starring Martin Donovan, Julie Kessler, Matt Malloy, Merritt Nelson, and Mary B. Ward.

Plot
College professor Jude (Donovan) becomes smitten with a student named Sofie (Ward). The two enjoy a brief time together, only to find that numerous obstacles, both tangible and intangible, prevent them from moving forward. Their conflict begins to expose parallels with the themes Jude covers in his literature class.

Cast 
 Martin Donovan as Jude
 Matt Malloy as Henry
 Rebecca Nelson as Katie
 Julie Kessler as Jill (as Julie Sukman)
 Mary B. Ward as Sofie

See also
Surviving Desire is generally distributed with two other short films by Hartley, Theory of Achievement and Ambition.

References

External links

1991 films
1991 comedy-drama films
Films directed by Hal Hartley
American independent films
American avant-garde and experimental films
American comedy-drama films
1990s avant-garde and experimental films
1991 independent films
1990s English-language films
1990s American films